Spillman is an unincorporated community in West Feliciana Parish, Louisiana, United States.

Notes

Unincorporated communities in West Feliciana Parish, Louisiana
Unincorporated communities in Louisiana